William E. Runner (March 16, 1851 – September 24, 1931) was an American politician in the state of Washington. He served in the Washington House of Representatives (1895 to 1897, with R. K. Kegley) and Washington State Senate.

References

Members of the Washington House of Representatives
1851 births
1931 deaths
Politicians from Indianapolis
Washington (state) state senators
Washington (state) Populists